This is a list of museums with major collections in ethnography and anthropology. It is sorted by descending number of objects listed.

 Canadian Museum of History, Ottawa, Ontario, Canada
 3.75 million artifacts
 Musée du quai Branly, Paris, France
 1,170,495 objects in 2014 including an iconotheque of about 700,000 pieces (plus a mediatheque of 260,000 and archives)
 University of Pennsylvania Museum of Archaeology and Anthropology, Philadelphia, PA, USA. 
 The Museum houses over 1.35 million objects, with one of the most comprehensive collections and Middle and Near-Eastern art in the world.
 Peter the Great Museum of Anthropology and Ethnography (Kunstkamera), St. Petersburg, Russia
 1 117,000 objects
 University of Cambridge Museum of Archaeology and Anthropology, Cambridge, UK
 800,000 objects
 Phoebe Hearst Museum of Anthropology, Berkeley, California, USA
 634,000 objects (In addition to Africa, Americas & Oceania, the museum embraces holdings from Europe, Ancient Mediterranean, Ancient Egypt, Asia and a large media collection)
 Pitt Rivers Museum, Oxford, UK
 500,000 objects
 Musée de l'Homme, Paris, France
 500,000 objects
 Ethnological Museum, Berlin, Germany
 500,000 objects (In addition to Africa, Americas & Oceania, the museum embraces holdings from Asia (South, South-East, Far-East and North Asia), the Islamic World, the Children's Museum and the Museum for the Blind.)
 Russian Museum of Ethnography, St. Petersburg, Russia
 500,000 objects
 British Museum, London, UK
 350,000 objects
 National Museum of Ethnology (Japan), Osaka, Japan
 335,000 objects
 National Museum of Ethnology (Netherlands), Leiden, Netherlands
 200,000 objects with 500,000 pieces in the image and multimedia libraries and 40,000 books.
 Museum für Völkerkunde, Vienna, Austria
 200,000 objects
 Staatliches Museum für Völkerkunde, Munich, Germany
 150,000 objects
 Museo Nacional de Antropología (National Museum of Anthropology), Mexico City, Mexico
 120,000 objects
 American Museum of Natural History Division of Anthropology, New York, USA
 119,000 objects
 Anima Mundi, Vatican City
 80,000 objects
 Horniman Museum, London, UK
 80,000 objects
 Museum of Anthropology at the University of British Columbia, Vancouver, BC, Canada
 36,000 ethnographic objects and 535,000 archaeological objects
Powell Cotton Museum, Kent, UK
 30,000 objects
 Mathers Museum of World Cultures, Indiana University, Bloomington, Indiana, USA
 30,000 ethnographic objects, 10,000 photographs 
 Museo de Antropología de Xalapa, Xalapa, Mexico.
 25,000 objets 
 Museu Antropológico Diretor Pestana (Brazil), Ijuí, Santa Cataria, Brazil, 
 29.000 pièces
 Ethnological Museum, Addis Ababa
 13,000 items
 Berndt Museum of Anthropology, Perth, Australia
 11,500 items
 Metropolitan Museum of Art, New York City, New York, USA
 11,000 objects
 Wooden Spoons Museum, Câmpulung Moldovenesc, Romania
 Over 6,000 objects

References

Major collections
Major collections
Ethnography and anthropology